Protostomia is the clade of animals once thought to be characterized by the formation of the organism's mouth before its anus during embryonic development. This nature has since been discovered to be extremely variable among Protostomia's members, although the reverse is typically true of its sister clade, Deuterostomia. Well known examples of protostomes are arthropods, molluscs, annelids, flatworms and nematodes. They are also called schizocoelomates since schizocoely typically occurs in them.

Together with the Deuterostomia and Xenacoelomorpha, these form the clade Bilateria, animals with bilateral symmetry, anteroposterior axis and three germ layers.

Protostomy

In animals at least as complex as earthworms, the first phase in gut development involves the embryo forming a dent on one side (the blastopore) which deepens to become its digestive tube (the archenteron). In the sister-clade, the deuterostomes, the original dent becomes the anus while the gut eventually tunnels through to make another opening, which forms the mouth. The protostomes (from Greek   'first' +   'mouth') were so named because it was once believed that in all cases the embryological dent formed the mouth while the anus was formed later, at the opening made by the other end of the gut.
It is now known that the fate of the blastopore among protostomes is extremely variable; while the evolutionary distinction between deuterostomes and protostomes remains valid, the descriptive accuracy of the name protostome is disputable.

Protostome and deuterostome embryos differ in several other ways. Many protostomes (the Spiralia clade) undergo spiral cleavage during cell division instead of radial cleavage.
Spiral cleavage happens because the cells' division planes are angled to the polar major axis, instead of being parallel or perpendicular to it.
Another difference is that secondary body cavities (coeloms) generally form by schizocoely, where the coelom forms out of a solid mass of embryonic tissue splitting away from the rest, instead of by enterocoelic pouching, where the coelom would otherwise form out of in-folded gut walls.

Evolution

The common ancestor of protostomes and deuterostomes was evidently a worm-like aquatic animal of the Ediacaran. The two clades diverged about 600 million years ago. Protostomes evolved into over a million species alive today, compared to about 60,000 deuterostome species.

Protostomes are divided into the Ecdysozoa (e.g. arthropods, nematodes) and the Spiralia (e.g. molluscs, annelids, platyhelminths, and rotifers). A modern consensus phylogenetic tree for the protostomes is shown below.
The timing of clades radiating into newer clades is given in mya (millions of years ago);  less certain placements are indicated with dashed lines.

See also
 Embryological origins of the mouth and anus
 The Taxonomicon for Karl Grobben

References

External links

 
Ediacaran first appearances
Infrakingdoms
Taxa named by Karl Grobben